The men's 800 metres at the 1969 European Athletics Championships was held in Athens, Greece, at Georgios Karaiskakis Stadium on 17, 18, and 19 September 1969.

Medalists

Results

Final
19 September

Semi-finals
18 September

Semi-final 1

Semi-final 2

Heats
17 September

Heat 1

Heat 2

Heat 3

Participation
According to an unofficial count, 21 athletes from 13 countries participated in the event.

 (1)
 (1)
 (2)
 (3)
 (1)
 (1)
 (1)
 (3)
 (2)
 (1)
 (1)
 (3)
 (1)

References

800 metres
800 metres at the European Athletics Championships